Marchula  is a small tourist spot in the Indian state of Uttarakhand.

References

External links
https://web.archive.org/web/20111010044127/http://newzstreet.com/news.php?news_id=5025 .
https://web.archive.org/web/20120422131853/http://tripsguru.com/places/Marchula/

Geography of Uttarakhand